For Once in My Life is the ninth (tenth overall) studio album by American singer-songwriter Stevie Wonder on Motown Records, released in November 1968. Then eighteen years old, Wonder had established himself as one of Motown's consistent hit-makers. This album continued Wonder's growth as a vocalist and songwriter, and is the first album where he shares credit as producer. It featured four songs that hit the Hot 100 charts: "For Once in My Life" (#2), "Shoo-Be-Doo-Be-Doo-Da-Day" (#9) and the modest hits "I Don't Know Why" (#39) and "You Met Your Match" (#35). It also marked the debut of the Hohner Clavinet on a Stevie Wonder album, which would become a mainstay on albums to come.

Track listing
Side one
"For Once in My Life" (Ron Miller, Orlando Murden) 2:48
"Shoo-Be-Doo-Be-Doo-Da-Day" (Henry Cosby, Sylvia Moy, Stevie Wonder) 2:45
"You Met Your Match" (Lula Mae Hardaway, Don Hunter, Wonder) 2:37
"I Wanna Make Her Love Me" (Henry Cosby, Hardaway, Moy, Wonder) 2:52
"I'm More Than Happy (I'm Satisfied)" (Henry Cosby, Cameron Grant, Moy, Wonder) 2:56
"I Don't Know Why" (Hardaway, Hunter, Paul Riser, Stevie Wonder) 2:46

Side two
"Sunny" (Bobby Hebb) 4:00
"I'd Be a Fool Right Now" (Cosby, Moy, Wonder) 2:54
"Ain't No Lovin'" (Hardaway, Hunter, Riser, Wonder) 2:36
"God Bless the Child" (Arthur Herzog Jr., Billie Holiday) 3:27
"Do I Love Her" (Wonder, Moy) 2:58
"The House on the Hill" (Lawrence Brown, Berry Gordy, Allen Story) 2:36

Personnel
Stevie Wonder – vocals, harmonica, piano, organ, clavinet, drums, percussion
The Originals – backing vocals
The Andantes – backing vocals
Earl Van Dyke – piano on "For Once in My Life"
James Jamerson – bass 
Uriel Jones – drums 
Robert White – guitar
The Funk Brothers – all other instruments

In other media
"I'd Be a Fool Right Now" would be remixed in 1977 for Wonder's Looking Back Anthology.

References 

1968 albums
Stevie Wonder albums
Albums produced by Henry Cosby
Tamla Records albums
Albums produced by Stevie Wonder
Albums recorded at Hitsville U.S.A.